Friedrich "Fritz" Wilhelm Braun, also commonly known simply as Fritz (born 18 July 1941) is a Brazilian basketball player. He competed in the men's tournament at the 1964 Summer Olympics.

References

External links
 

1941 births
Living people
Brazilian men's basketball players
1963 FIBA World Championship players
Olympic basketball players of Brazil
Basketball players at the 1964 Summer Olympics
Basketball players from Rio de Janeiro (city)
Olympic bronze medalists for Brazil
Olympic medalists in basketball
Medalists at the 1964 Summer Olympics
Basketball players at the 1963 Pan American Games
Pan American Games silver medalists for Brazil
Pan American Games medalists in basketball
FIBA World Championship-winning players
Esporte Clube Sírio basketball players
Medalists at the 1963 Pan American Games